The LG L Fino is an Android smartphone/phablet designed and manufactured by LG Electronics. It was released on 10 August 2014.

Specifications

Design 
LG L Fino features a design similar to the LG G3. The phone has a 4.5 inch display with sizable bezels; the top bezel includes the front-facing camera and the earpiece, and the bottom bezel has an "LG" logo. On the side frame, there is a 3.5 mm headphone jack and a microphone at the top, and there is a microUSB port and a microphone at the bottom. Unlike most of the smartphones, the power button and the volume buttons are located at the back under the rear-facing camera instead of the side frame; there is also an LED flash, an "LG" logo and a speaker at the back. The phone is made of plastic and the back cover is removable, removing the back cover reveals the removable battery.

LG L Fino is available in white, black, gold, red and green.

Hardware 
LG L Fino features:the Qualcomm Snapdragon 200 system-on-chip with a 1.2 GHz quad-core ARM Cortex-A7 CPU and an Adreno 302 GPU. The phone comes with 1 GB RAM and 4 GB internal storage expandable through the microSD card slot. It has a 4.5 inch WVGA (480x800 pixels resolution) capacitive touchscreen with 207 ppi pixel density. It has a 1900 mAh removable Li-Ion battery.

LG L Fino has an 8 MP rear-facing camera with LED flash, Gesture Shot and Touch & Shoot, and a 0.3 MP (VGA) front-facing camera with Front Camera Light. The rear-facing camera can record videos at 800x480 pixels resolution and the front-facing camera can record videos at 640x480 pixels resolution.

Software 
LG L Fino runs on Android 4.4.2 KitKat with LG's custom user interface. It comes with LG's Knock Code, tap to unlock and QuickMemo features, and LG's camera application.

See also
List of LG mobile phones
List of Android devices
Smartphone
LG G series

References

External links

Gadgets 
  fr

Android (operating system) devices
LG Electronics smartphones
Mobile phones introduced in 2013